Platyptilia pauliani is a moth of the family Pterophoridae. It is known from Madagascar.

The larvae feed on Calendula species and Emilia citrina.

References

pauliani
Endemic fauna of Madagascar
Moths of Madagascar
Moths of Africa
Moths described in 1994